Yamanoue may refer to:

People
Yamanoue is a Japanese surname. Notable people with this surname include:

 Yamanoue no Okura (山上憶良 or 山於億良; 660-773) Japanese poet
 Yamanoue Sōji (山上宗二; 1544-1590) Japanese tea master
 Yusuke Yamanoue (山野上祐介), an author recognized as "Yamanoue" under the International Code of Zoological Nomenclature; see List of authors of names published under the ICZN

Fictional characters
 Dr. Yamanoue Hakase (山之上博士) from the Osamu Tezuka anime "ジェッターマルス", Jetter Mars
 Yamanoue Kiyomori, the Lord Of Doom Fist; from the shounen manga comic book "我間乱", Gamaran

Places
 Yamanoue Village (山之上村; Yamanoue-mura), a village that was merged into the Japanese town of Ryūō, Shiga

Facilities and structures
 Yamanoue Hotel (山の上ホテル; Hilltop Hotel),  Chiyoda, Tokyo, Japan; see List of Art Deco architecture
 Yamanoue Stele and Kofun (山上碑及び古墳; Yamanoue hi oyobi kofun) a National Historic Site in Takasaki, Gunma, Japan; see List of Historic Sites of Japan (Gunma)
 Yamanoue Preschool, Nichinan, Hino, Tottori, Japan; see Nichinan, Tottori

See also

 Sanjo (disambiguation)
 Sanjō Station (disambiguation)
 Yamagami (disambiguation)